Akron is an unincorporated community in northeast Harrison County, in the U.S. state of Missouri. The community is on Missouri Route O approximately six miles north-northwest of Cainsville and six miles east-northeast of Blythedale. The Thompson River flows past one-half mile to the east.

History
Akron was platted in 1858, and named after Akron, Ohio, the native home of a share of the first settlers. A post office called Akron was established in 1861, and remained in operation until 1908.

In 1925, Akron had 35 inhabitants.

References

Unincorporated communities in Harrison County, Missouri
Unincorporated communities in Missouri